Calliostoma consimile is a species of sea snail, a marine gastropod mollusk in the family Calliostomatidae.

Description
The size of the shell varies between 10 mm and 20 mm.
The pyramidal shell has a very pretty purplish lilac color, encircled with pale transverse ridges. The spire contains seven whorls. The nuclear one is rounded and white. The rest are flat, with three to four strong spiral lirae, whereof the uppermost or the two uppermost, are more or less granulous. The interstices are smooth, with the exception of oblique lines of growth. The suture is marked by a thread-like keel. The body whorl is acutely angled below the middle, with a flattish base, which has two or three sulci near the angle, and two white or pale lilac lirae encircling the umbilical region. The aperture is somewhat obliquely quadrangular. The pearly columella is margined with a white callosity.

Distribution
This marine species occurs in the Southern Atlantic Ocean from Tierra del Fuego to Rio de la Plata, Argentina

References

 Smith, E. A. 1881. Account of the Zoological collections made during the survey of the H.M.S. 'Alert' in the Straits of Magellan and on the coast of Patagonia. IV. Mollusca and Molluscoidea. Proceedings of the Zoological Society of London 1881: 22-44, pls. 3-5.
 Ihering, H. von. 1907. Les Mollusques fossiles du Tertiare et du Crétacé Supérieur de l'Argentine. Anales del Museo Nacional de Buenos Aires (3)7: xiii + 611 pp., 18 pls.

External links
 To Encyclopedia of Life
 To World Register of Marine Species
 

consimile
Gastropods described in 1881